The 2000-2001 ABA season was the first season of the new American Basketball Association. The season lasted from November 2000 to the championship game in March 2001 featuring the top seeded Chicago Skyliners and the fourth-seeded Detroit Dogs. Detroit defeated Chicago, 107-91 in the 2001 ABA championship game.

Regular Season Standings

Postseason Results

References

American Basketball Association (2000–present) seasons
ABA